This Is Christmas is the ninth studio album by classical crossover artist Katherine Jenkins and was released on 30 October in the US and Canada, and 26 November in the UK.

Track listing

United States edition

United Kingdom edition

Charts

Weekly charts

Year-end charts

Certifications

Personnel 
 Katherine Jenkins  – lead vocals

References 

Katherine Jenkins albums
2012 Christmas albums
Christmas albums by Welsh artists
Warner Music Group albums
Pop Christmas albums
Classical Christmas albums